Federal Route 7 is the main federal road in northern Peninsula Malaysia. The road connects Padang Besar, Perlis to Alor Setar, Kedah.

Route background
The Kilometre Zero of the Federal Route 7 starts at the Malaysia–Thailand border near Padang Besar, Perlis.

Features
At most sections, the Federal Route 7 was built under the JKR R5 road standard, allowing maximum speed limit of up to 90 km/h.

There are no overlaps, alternate routes, or sections with motorcycle lanes.

List of junctions and towns

References

Malaysian Federal Roads